, son of Fusahira, was a Japanese court noble (kugyo) of the Muromachi period. He held a regent position Kampaku from 1483-1487. Kanesuke was his son who he had with a daughter of Ichijō Kaneyoshi.

References
 https://web.archive.org/web/20070927231943/http://nekhet.ddo.jp/people/japan/fstakatukasa.html

1445 births
1517 deaths
Fujiwara clan
Takatsukasa family
People of Muromachi-period Japan